This is a list of electoral divisions and wards in the ceremonial county of Northamptonshire in the East Midlands. All changes since the re-organisation of local government following the passing of the Local Government Act 1972 are shown. The number of councillors elected for each electoral division or ward is shown in brackets.

Unitary authorities

North Northamptonshire

Wards from 1 April 2021 (first election 6 May 2021) to present:

West Northamptonshire

Wards from 1 April 2021 (first election 6 May 2021) to present:

Former county council

Northamptonshire

Electoral Divisions from 1 April 1974 (first election 12 April 1973) to 7 May 1981:

Electoral Divisions from 7 May 1981 to 7 June 2001:

Electoral Divisions from 7 June 2001 to 2 May 2013:

Electoral Divisions from 2 May 2013 to 1 April 2021:

† minor boundary changes in 2017

Former district councils

Corby

Wards from 1 April 1974 (first election 7 June 1973) to 6 May 1976:

Wards from 6 May 1976 to 6 May 1999:

Wards from 6 May 1999 to 3 May 2007:

Wards from 3 May 2007 to 7 May 2015:

Wards from 7 May 2015 to 1 April 2021:

Daventry

Wards from 1 April 1974 (first election 7 June 1973) to 3 May 1979:

Wards from 3 May 1979 to 6 May 1999:

Wards from 6 May 1999 to 3 May 2012:

Wards from 3 May 2012 to 1 April 2021:

East Northamptonshire

Wards from 1 April 1974 (first election 7 June 1973) to 3 May 1979:

Wards from 3 May 1979 to 6 May 1999:

Wards from 6 May 1999 to 3 May 2007:

Wards from 3 May 2007 to 1 April 2021:

† minor boundary changes in 2015

Kettering

Wards from 1 April 1974 (first election 7 June 1973) to 3 May 1979:

Wards from 3 May 1979 to 6 May 1999:

Wards from 6 May 1999 to 3 May 2007:

Wards from 3 May 2007 to 1 April 2021:

Northampton

Wards from 1 April 1974 (first election 7 June 1973) to 3 May 1979:

Wards from 3 May 1979 to 6 May 1999:

Wards from 6 May 1999 to 5 May 2011:

Wards from 5 May 2011 to 1 April 2021:

South Northamptonshire

Wards from 1 April 1974 (first election 7 June 1973) to 6 May 1976:

Wards from 6 May 1976 to 6 May 1999:

Wards from 6 May 1999 to 3 May 2007:

Wards from 3 May 2007 to 1 April 2021:

Wellingborough

Wards from 1 April 1974 (first election 7 June 1973) to 5 May 1983:

Wards from 5 May 1983 to 6 May 1999:

Wards from 6 May 1999 to 7 May 2015:

Wards from 7 May 2015 to 1 April 2021:

Electoral wards by constituency

Corby
Barnwell, Central, Danesholme, Dryden, East, Fineshade, Hazelwood, Hillside, Irthlingborough, King's Forest, Kingswood, Lloyds, Lodge Park, Lower Nene, Lyveden, Oundle, Prebendal, Raunds Saxon, Raunds Windmill, Ringstead, Rural East, Rural North, Rural West, Shire Lodge, Stanwick, Thrapston, West, Woodford.

Daventry
Abbey North, Abbey South, Badby, Barby and Kilsby, Boughton and Pitsford, Brampton, Braunston, Brixworth, Byfield, Clipston, Cote, Crick, Downs, Drayton, Earls Barton, Flore, Grange, Harpole, Heyford, Hill, Long Buckby, Moulton, Ravensthorpe, Spratton, Walgrave, Weedon, Welford, West, West Haddon and Guilsborough, Woodford, Yelvertoft.

Kettering
All Saints, Avondale, Barton, Brambleside, Buccleuch, Latimer, Loatland, Millbrook, Pipers Hill, Plessy, Queen Eleanor, St Andrew's, St Giles, St Mary's, St Michael's, St Peter's, Slade, Spinney, Tresham, Trinity, Warkton, Welland, Wicksteed.

Northampton North
Abington, Boughton Green, Eastfield, Headlands, Kingsley, Kingsthorpe, Lumbertubs, Parklands, St David, Thorplands.

Northampton South
Billing, Castle, Delapre, Ecton Brook, New Duston, Old Duston, St Crispin, St James, Spencer, Weston.

South Northamptonshire
Astwell, Blakesley, Blisworth, Brackley East, Brackley South, Brackley West, Chase, Cogenhoe, Cosgrove, Courteenhall, Deanshanger, East Hunsbury, Grafton, Kings Sutton, Kingthorn, Little Brook, Middleton Cheney, Nene Valley, Salcey, Silverstone, Steane, Tove, Towcester Brook, Towcester Mill, Wardoun, Washington, West Hunsbury, Whittlewood, Yardley.

Wellingborough
Brickhill, Castle, Croyland, Finedon, Great Doddington and Wilby, Hemmingwell, Higham Ferrers, Irchester, North, Queensway, Redwell East, Redwell West, Rushden East, Rushden North, Rushden South, Rushden West, South, Swanspool, Wollaston.

See also
List of parliamentary constituencies in Northamptonshire

References

 
Northamptonshire